Malý Bor is a municipality and village in Klatovy District in the Plzeň Region of the Czech Republic. It has about 500 inhabitants.

Administrative parts
Villages of Hliněný Újezd, Malé Hydčice and Týnec are administrative parts of Malý Bor.

References

Villages in Klatovy District